The Ulster GAA Football Under-20 Championship, known simply as the Ulster Under-20 Championship, is an annual inter-county Gaelic football competition organised by the Ulster Council of the Gaelic Athletic Association (GAA). It is the highest inter-county football competition for male players between the ages of 17 and 20 in the province of Ulster. The championship was contested as the Ulster Under-21 Championship between 1963 and 2016 before changing to an under-20 age category from 2018. It is sponsored by EirGrid.

The final, currently held in March, serves as the culmination of a series of games played during a three-week period, and the results determine which team receives the J. J. Fahy Cup. The championship has always been played on a straight knockout basis whereby once a team loses they are eliminated from the championship.

The Ulster Championship is an integral part of the wider GAA Football Under-20 All-Ireland Championship. The winners of the Ulster final, like their counterparts in the other three provinces, advance to the semi-final stage of the All-Ireland series of games.

Nine teams currently participate in the Ulster Championship. Tyrone are the most successful team with 14 titles. The title has been won at least once by all nine teams, with all of them winning the title more than once. Tyrone are the current champions.

Wins Listed By County

Finals Listed By Year

Records and statistics

Final

Team

Most titles: 15:
 Tyrone (1972, 1973, 1980, 1990, 1991, 1992, 2000, 2001, 2002, 2003, 2006, 2015, 2019, 2020, 2022)
Most consecutive title wins: 4:
Tyrone (2000, 2001, 2002, 2003)
Cavan ( 2011, 2012, 2013, 2014)
Most appearances in a final: 23:
Tyrone (1971, 1972, 1973, 1974, 1975, 1979, 1980, 1985, 1990, 1991, 1992, 2000, 2001, 2002, 2003, 2006, 2011, 2012, 2015, 2016, 2019, 2020, 2022)

Teams

By decade

The most successful team of each decade, judged by number of Ulster Championship titles, is as follows:

 1960s: 3 for Donegal (1963–64-6)
 1970s: 3 for Down (1977-78-79)
 1980s: 2 each for Donegal (1982–87), Derry (1983–86) and Down (1985–86)
 1990s: 3 for Tyrone (1990-91-92)
 2000s: 5 for Tyrone (2000-01-02-03-06)
 2010s: 4 for Cavan (2011-12-13-14)

Gaps

Top ten longest gaps between successive championship titles:
 23 years: Fermanagh (1971-1994)
 21 years: Derry (1997-2018)
 20 years: Down (1985-2005)
 18 years: Monaghan (1981-1999)
 17 years: Monaghan (1999-2016)
 16 years: Donegal (1966-1982)
 15 years: Donegal (1995-2010)
 15 years: Cavan (1996-2011)
 14 years: Antrim (1975-1989)
 12 years: Down (1965-1977)

Sources
 Roll of Honour on gaainfo.com
 www.kilkennygaa.ie Roll of Honour (at Downloads/2011 Bible Web.pdf)

References

Ulster
3